Mirlung  is a village development committee in Tanahun District in the Gandaki Zone of central Nepal. At the time of the 1991 Nepal census it had a population of 6840 people living in 1439 individual households.

it should be a mirlung

External links
UN map of the municipalities of Tanahu District

Populated places in Tanahun District